Mikko Lehtonen (born 16 January 1994) is a Finnish professional ice hockey defenceman for the ZSC Lions of the National League (NL). He has previously played with the Toronto Maple Leafs and Columbus Blue Jackets in the National Hockey League (NHL).

Playing career
Lehtonen made his SM-liiga debut playing with TPS during the 2011–12 season. For the season 2015–2016, Lehtonen moved to the team KooKoo for a two-year contract. He made his breakthrough in the league and made all 60 regular rounds. Lehtonen ranked Juha Leimu of Pelicans in the second round of the SM Liiga defender's goal. In the 2016–17 season, he was KooKoo's second-best point-keeper and the most powerful defender until the threshold of the Liiga move. In February 2017, Lehtonen spent the rest of the season for the Swedish Hockey League (SHL) in HV71, and he won the Swedish Championship at the end of the season.

Lehtonen moved to Tappara for the 2017–18 season agreeing to an initial two-year contract. In 2018, Lehtonen left Tappara by mutual consent and re-joined HV71 of the SHL.

On 9 April 2019, Lehtonen as a free agent, left HV71, returning to Finland in signing a two-year contract with KHL participant, Jokerit.

Lehtonen appeared in 60 games with Jokerit during the 2019–20 season and registered 49 points (17 goals, 32 assists), which led all KHL defencemen. He represented Jokerit at the 2020 KHL All-Star Game and was named KHL Defenceman of the Month for three consecutive months from November to January. He had a goal and three assists in six KHL playoff games before the season's cancellation.

As a free agent, Lehtonen gained NHL interest, and on 4 May 2020, the Toronto Maple Leafs signed Lehtonen to a one-year entry-level contract for the 2020–21 season. With the North American season delayed due to the COVID-19 pandemic, on 1 August 2020, Lehtonen was returned to Jokerit on loan until the resumption of NHL training camp in November. Lehtonen was released from his contract with Jokerit on 20 November 2020, having collected 17 points through 17 games.

On 12 March 2021, Lehtonen was traded by the Maple Leafs to the Columbus Blue Jackets in exchange for Veini Vehviläinen.

After the  season, Lehtonen signed a one-year contract to return to Columbus. However, on 12 October 2021, it was announced that he was suspended by the team and placed on unconditional waivers for the purpose of a buyout after failing to report to the Cleveland Monsters, the Blue Jackets AHL affiliate. As a free agent from the Blue Jackets, on 17 October 2021, Lehtonen returned to the KHL in agreeing to a four-year contract with Russian based outfit, SKA Saint Petersburg.

Following the 2022 Russian invasion of Ukraine, Lehtonen decided to participate in the 2021–22 KHL postseason, despite the exit of most Finnish players and two of the KHL's non-Russia-based teams.

International play

Internationally, Lehtonen has represented Finland at multiple events, including the World Championships in 2017 and 2019, winning gold at the 2019 tournament and earning recognition on the World Championship All-Star Team. He also skated for Finland at the Olympic Games in 2018 and 2022, getting gold and recognition on the Olympic All-Star Team at the 2022 games. In addition, he played at the 2014 World Junior Championships, where he captured gold.

Career statistics

Regular season and playoffs

International

Awards and honours

References

External links

1994 births
Living people
Columbus Blue Jackets players
Finnish ice hockey defencemen
Jokerit players
KooKoo players
HV71 players
Finnish expatriate ice hockey players in Canada
Finnish expatriate ice hockey players in Russia
Finnish expatriate ice hockey players in Sweden
Finnish expatriate ice hockey players in the United States
Ice hockey players at the 2018 Winter Olympics
Ice hockey players at the 2022 Winter Olympics
Olympic ice hockey players of Finland
Medalists at the 2022 Winter Olympics
Olympic gold medalists for Finland
Olympic medalists in ice hockey
SKA Saint Petersburg players
Toronto Maple Leafs players
HC TPS players
Sportspeople from Turku
TuTo players
Undrafted National Hockey League players
ZSC Lions players